Following is a list of senators of Hauts-de-Seine, people who have represented the department of Hauts-de-Seine in the Senate of France.
The department was created in 1968 during a reorganization of the former Seine-et-Oise and Seine departments.

Senators for Hauts-de-Seine under the French Fifth Republic:

References

Sources

 
Lists of members of the Senate (France) by department